Judith Smith or Judy Smith could refer to:

Judith Smith Ladson (1766-1820), American socialite and heiress
Judith Winsor Smith (1821-1921), American women's suffrage activist and abolitionist
Judith Kaye (born Judith Ann Smith) (1938-2016), American jurist and former Chief Judge of the New York Court of Appeals
Judy Smith (born 1958), American crisis manager
Judith Anne Smith, American jurist and Associate Judge on the Superior Court of the District of Columbia
Judith Eldredge Smith, American homicide victim